Joanna Quassa is a Canadian Inuk politician, who was elected to the Legislative Assembly of Nunavut in the 2021 Nunavut general election. She represents the electoral district of Aggu.

She is the sister-in-law of her predecessor Paul Quassa, and previously served as mayor of Igloolik.

References

Living people
Members of the Legislative Assembly of Nunavut
Women MLAs in Nunavut
Inuit politicians
21st-century Canadian politicians
21st-century Canadian women politicians
Inuit from Nunavut
People from Igloolik
Mayors of places in Nunavut
Women mayors of places in Nunavut
Year of birth missing (living people)